The Neurobiology Research Center (NRC) is a specialized research centre in the premises of the National Institute of Mental Health and Neurosciences, Bangalore, India. The centre provides infrastructure to support translational research and development of cutting-edge technology in frontier areas of neuroscience. NRC houses fourteen research laboratories and four central facilities, including the Human Brain Museum, the only one of its kind in India.

Facilities and infrastructure

Research laboratories
 Advanced Flow Cytometry Laboratory
Bioinformatics & Proteomics Laboratory
 Cell Culture & Stem Cell Biology Laboratory
Electrophysiology Laboratory
Music Cognition Laboratory
 Metabolic Laboratory
 Multi-modal Brain Image Analysis Laboratory
 Molecular Biology Laboratories – Communicable and Non-communicable
 Molecular Genetics Laboratory
 Neuromuscular Laboratory
 Neurotoxicology Laboratory
Neuro-Oncology Laboratory
 Optical Imaging & Electrophysiology Laboratory
Translational Psychiatry Laboratory

References

External links
 Official Webpage

Neuroscience research centres in India
Research institutes in Bangalore
Medical research institutes in India
2007 establishments in Karnataka
Research institutes established in 2007